The Andean tapeti (Sylvilagus andinus) or Andean cottontail is a species of cottontail rabbit native to Colombia, Venezuela, Peru and Ecuador. It was previously considered a subspecies of the common tapeti (Sylvilagus brasiliensis). Living at high elevations in the treeless Páramo of the Andes, analysis in 2017 confirmed that it is sufficiently distinct in both appearance and genetics to be considered a species in its own right. Although widespread, it remains poorly known, as few studies have been conducted on its biology and habits as distinct from those of the tapeti

References

Sylvilagus
Mammals of Brazil
Mammals described in 1897